Starpoint was an American R&B and funk band from Maryland that was active from 1978 to 1990 recording 10 albums during that time. It comprised four brothers and two other musicians. The ten albums released did well, some reaching the US R&B Charts.

Biography

Beginnings
Brothers George Jr., Ernesto, Lloyd, Orlando, and Gregory Phillips played under the name J.R. and the Royals, later renamed Licyndiana before becoming Starpoint in 1978, by which time four of the five brothers were still part of the lineup, and Kayode Adeyemo and Renée Diggs had joined the band.

At this point, Ernesto Phillips played lead guitar and trumpet, as well as singing lead and backing vocals; Orlando Phillips played bass guitar, keyboards, and saxophone and sang background vocals; Gregory Phillips played drums and percussion and provided background vocals; George Phillips, Jr. played keyboards and sang lead and background vocals. Renee Diggs shared principal lead and background vocal duties. In addition to being another vocalist, Kayode Adeyemo acted as a second bassist and keyboardist, primarily during live performances, though he did contribute instrumentally to the group's early studio albums, and more occasionally on future recordings. This lineup stayed intact for the next 12 years, honing a sound that was also shaped by various producers, including Lionel Job, Keith Diamond, Bernard Edwards and Teddy Riley (in addition to the bandmembers' own contributions to production).

In 1979, the band secured a national recording deal and released their self-titled debut album, Starpoint! in 1980. A single from the album, "I Just Wanna Dance with You," became their first top 20 hit on the R&B chart. They released at least one album every year throughout the first half of the 80s. Elektra Records reissued their sole Boardwalk album, 1983's It's So Delicious.

Success
The album Restless brought them crossover success onto the Billboard Hot 100 with the single "Object of My Desire." Co-written by band members Kayode Adeyemo and Ernesto Phillips along with R&B musician/producer Keith Diamond, the tune also became Starpoint's first of several R&B top ten hits. The follow-up single "What You've Been Missin'" peaked at No. 9 in the R&B top ten. The title track "Restless" was also released as a single, peaking at No. 11 in the R&B charts.

The band embarked on a lengthy tour in support of the album, partially with Morris Day and later with Luther Vandross, Isley Jasper Isley, and Atlantic Starr. It was during this tour that Diggs was diagnosed with Multiple sclerosis; however, she continued to tour and record with the group, without sacrificing her signature stage presence.

In 1987, the band released their follow-up album, Sensational, which featured a third top ten R&B hit, "He Wants My Body". Still, the overall commercial success of this album paled in comparison to its predecessor, with no singles approaching the Pop 40. The group went on to release two additional albums - Hot to the Touch (1988) and Have You Got What It Takes? (1990) - sustaining modest R&B chart success with various singles.

Individual Post-Starpoint Careers
In 1990, Renée Diggs recorded a solo album titled Oasis that was released in Europe. Several of the tracks on this album were co-written by Diggs and Starpoint guitarist Ernesto Phillips. She created the Renée Diggs Foundation for Multiple Sclerosis, to help bring attention to the disease. She died on March 18, 2005, due to a heart condition, at the age of 50. Oasis was released in the U.S. after her death. 

In 2000, Ernesto Phillips began working with singer-songwriter Terry Cole (Sly Boots) and signed him to his label, Longevity Records. The pair would collaborate on many tracks from 2000–2001. He died on March 25, 2004, as the result of a stroke. The Ernesto Phillips Scholarship for Talented Youth was established in his memory and as a tribute to his efforts in helping younger children to realize their ambitions of becoming musicians.

Other band members became involved with songwriting and session work for R&B artists. In 1988, Adeyemo was credited with co-writing Milli Vanilli's hit "Girl You Know It's True". Milli Vanilli's accompanying American album, titled after the hit single, also featured a song composed by Ernesto Phillips, entitled "More Than You'll Ever Know".

From 2001 to 2006, Greg Phillips toured with Najee and Angela Bofill simultaneously. 

In 2011, the band regrouped with the four remaining members George Phillips, Orlando Phillips, Ky Adeyemo, and Greg Phillips, performing a one-off live show in Lyon, France.

George Phillips died on February 3, 2021, from sepsis. His family established the George McKenzie Phillips, Jr. Fund for Mental Health and Drug Abuse Rehabilitation in his memory, reflecting his dedication and contributions to these fields as a counselor in his post-Starpoint career.

Band members
Renée Diggs: Lead vocals (July 23, 1954 – March 18, 2005)
Ernesto McKenzie Phillips: Guitars, lead vocals (July 13, 1953 – March 25, 2004)
Orlando Phillips: Bass guitar, keyboard bass, vocals, saxophone
George Phillips, Jr.: Lead vocals, keyboards (died Feb 3, 2021)
Greg Phillips: Drums, vocals, percussion
Kayode Adeyemo: 2nd bass guitar, occasional keyboards during live performances

Discography

Albums

Compilation albums
2005: Object of My Desire and Other Hits (includes singles released between 1983 and 1987)

Singles

References

External links
Official website
Discography at Discogs.

American soul musical groups
American dance music groups
American boogie musicians
American freestyle music groups
Musical groups from Maryland